Elymnias casiphone is a butterfly in the family Nymphalidae. It was described by Carl Geyer in 1827. It is found in the Indomalayan realm.

Subspecies
E. c. casiphone (West Java)
E. c. alumna Fruhstorfer, 1907 (East Java)
E. c. saueri Distant, 1882 (Burma, Peninsular Malaysia, Thailand, Langkawi Island)
E. c. djilantik Martin, 1909 (Bali)
E. c. praetextata Fruhstorfer, 1896 (Lombok)

References

External links
"Elymnias Hübner, 1818" at Markku Savela's Lepidoptera and Some Other Life Forms

Elymnias
Butterflies described in 1827